The 1955 Temple Owls football team was an American football team that represented Temple University as an independent during the 1955 college football season. In its first and only season under head coach Josh Cody, the team compiled a 0–8 record.  Cody was Temple's athletic director (1952–1959) and basketball coach (1942–1952); he stepped in as head football coach for the 1955 season following the departure of the prior head coach, Albert Kawal. The team played its home games at Temple Stadium in Philadelphia.

Schedule

References

Temple
Temple Owls football seasons
College football winless seasons
Temple Owls football